Frank Duff Moores (February 18, 1933 – July 10, 2005) served as the second premier of Newfoundland. He served as leader of the Progressive Conservatives from 1972 until his retirement in 1979. Moores was also a successful businessman in both the fishing industry and federal lobbying.

Early life and education
Born in Carbonear, Newfoundland, Moores was educated at St. Andrew's College in Aurora, Ontario. He then briefly attended Boston University in the fall of 1951, but left two months later after an argument with one of his professors. He later worked briefly in the Boston fish industry and then returned to Newfoundland, where he worked in his father's fish plant. His father, Silas Moores, was a wealthy businessman in that industry.

Expansion of family business
Moores worked with his father to expand the family business, North East Fisheries, to the stage that it became the largest fish processor in Newfoundland by the early 1960s and employed 2,000 people. With his father's death of a heart attack in July 1962, he followed through on a plan to take the company to a year-round operation from the traditional summer-autumn format and then sold a majority interest to British owners.

Politics
With no previous experience in politics, Moores was first elected in 1968 to the House of Commons as a Progressive Conservative. The party captured six of seven seats in the province, almost all of which had been Liberal since 1949, against the national trend that elected Pierre Elliott Trudeau with a strong majority. Moores was elected to a one-year term as president of the federal PC Party in 1969.

In 1970, he resigned his federal seat and became the leader of the Progressive Conservative Party of Newfoundland. He was asked to form a government in January 1972, several months after the October 1971 election, which resulted in a near tie between Joey Smallwood's Liberals and the Progressive Conservatives. Moores soon called a new March 1972 election and won a strong majority. In the 1975 election, he won a reduced majority.

As premier, Moores advocated rural development and provincial control of natural resources as well as economic development.

Later life
He left politics in March 1979 to re-enter business and became a lobbyist. In 1983, he was an organizer of the successful federal Progressive Conservative leadership campaign for Brian Mulroney.

Moores served as an adviser to Mulroney premiership and was appointed to the Board of Air Canada, which was then a crown corporation. He also worked for Government Consultants International (GCI), a powerful Ottawa-based international lobbying firm, which then had as clients the airline firms Wardair and Nordair, which were competitors of Air Canada. Over accusations of conflict of interest, GCI later gave up Wardair and Nordair as clients. He resigned his Air Canada directorship shortly after GCI had taken on the Airbus file.

In 1987, he became the chairman of GCI and retired from this position in 1990. In the 1990s, he regained prominence for his alleged role in the Airbus affair.

On July 10, 2005, Moores died of liver cancer in Perth, Ontario.

In November 2007, in the wake of new revelations about the Airbus affair by Karlheinz Schreiber, The Globe and Mail published evidence indicating that Moores had written a letter about the Airbus deal to Franz Josef Strauss, the chairman of Airbus Industrie. Moore, until his death, denied having any involvement in the affair.

References

Sources
 Frank Moores: The Time of His Life, by Janice Wells, 2008, Key Porter Books, Toronto.

External links
 Frank Duff Moores  at The Canadian Encyclopedia
 

1933 births
2005 deaths
Premiers of Newfoundland and Labrador
Members of the House of Commons of Canada from Newfoundland and Labrador
Members of the United Church of Canada
St. Andrew's College (Aurora) alumni
People from Carbonear
Canadian lobbyists
Progressive Conservative Party of Newfoundland and Labrador MHAs
Deaths from cancer in Ontario
Leaders of the Progressive Conservative Party of Newfoundland and Labrador